John Llewellyn Mathews (22 October 1914 – 25 October 1994) was an Australian rules footballer who played with North Melbourne in the Victorian Football League (VFL).

Mathews started his football with Bealiba and from there he went to Maryborough in the Bendigo League. In 1941 he played three games with North Melbourne, and the following year joined the R.A.A.F. and briefly served in World War II. After playing with Mirboo North in Gippsland he moved to Tasmania where he both played with and coached Ulverstone until his retirement in 1951.

Notes

External links 

1914 births
Australian rules footballers from Victoria (Australia)
North Melbourne Football Club players
Royal Australian Air Force personnel of World War II
1994 deaths
Royal Australian Air Force airmen